Okrągłe  is a village in the administrative district of Gmina Jeleniewo, within Suwałki County, Podlaskie Voivodeship, in north-eastern Poland.

Climate
The Köppen Climate Classification subtype for this climate is "Dfb". (Warm Summer Continental Climate).

References

Villages in Suwałki County